Mike Porfirio is an American politician. He serves as a Democratic member for the 11th district of the Illinois Senate.

Life and career 
Porfirio attended United States Naval Academy, Purdue University and the University of Illinois Chicago.

In 2022, Porfirio defeated Thomas McGill in the general election for the 11th district of the Illinois Senate, winning 65 percent of the votes. He assumed office in 2023.

References 

Living people
Year of birth missing (living people)
Place of birth missing (living people)
Democratic Party Illinois state senators
21st-century American politicians
Purdue University alumni
University of Illinois Chicago alumni